Delphinium hesperium is a species of larkspur known by the common name foothill larkspur. It is also sometimes called western larkspur and coastal larkspur, but these names are less specific since other species share them. It is endemic to California, where it grows in woodland and grassland in the northern half of the state. This wildflower generally reaches one half to one meter in height. It has deeply lobed, prominently veined leaves, mostly located near the base of the plant. The inflorescence may hold very few to over 100 flowers, each on a long, thick pedicel. The flowers are usually a brilliant blue or purple, and sometimes lighter pinkish to white. Often the sepals are dark in color and the petals lighter. The spur is about one to two centimeters long.

There are three subspecies of this plant. The Cuyamaca larkspur (ssp. cuyamacae) is native to the Peninsular Ranges, occurring near Cuyamaca Lake and possibly Palomar Mountain in San Diego County. The ssp. hesperium is native to the North Coast Ranges. The pale-flowered western larkspur (ssp. pallescens), which has white, pink, or light blue sepals, occurs in the Coast Ranges.

References

External links
Jepson Manual Treatment
Photo gallery

hesperium
Endemic flora of California